Starship Children's Hospital is a public children's hospital in Auckland, New Zealand. Opened on 18 November 1991, it was one of the first purpose-built children's hospitals in New Zealand, and is the largest such facility in the country. Although a separate facility, it is located on the same grounds as the Auckland City Hospital in Grafton, Auckland, and is adjacent to the Auckland Medical School.

On 1 July 2022 Te Whatu Ora – Health New Zealand and Te Aka Whai Ora – Māori Health Authority became Aotearoa’s new national health authorities and Starship became part of Health New Zealand.

There are more than 140,000 patient visits to Starship Child Health each year including around 1000 outreach clinics where Starship clinicians offer specialist consultation and support to their peers all around New Zealand.

Facilities

Character 
The main Starship building opened on 18 November 1991 on the grounds of Auckland City Hospital. Its name was chosen to appeal to children and young people and to reflect the building's design. The building has a central atrium lit by natural light and designed to a rainforest theme with a playground. Each of its five levels is painted a different colour, with a symbolic meaning: aqua for the Pacific Ocean; orange for land; blue for sky; yellow for sunshine; and pink for health.

Medical 
Facilities include inpatient and outpatient services as well as community-based services such as Community Child Health and Disability Service, Safekids and Paediatric Home Care. The building has nine wards and a capacity of 219 beds. Besides the main building, Starship has outpatient clinics for the Auckland region in Tamaki, West Auckland and North Shore, as well as being associated with approximately 45 Outreach Clinics throughout the country.

Starship Hospital is the major trauma centre for children in the Auckland region, and the tertiary major trauma centre for children in the Northland, Auckland, and northern parts of the Waikato region.

Others 
The volunteer group Radio Lollipop operate a hospital radio station, as well as visiting children with games and entertainment in the evenings. 

The hospital includes a number of food outlets and a convenience store.

References

External links 

 Welcome to Starship Children’s Health and Starship Foundation (official hospital website)

Hospital buildings completed in 1991
Children's hospitals in New Zealand
Teaching hospitals in New Zealand
Buildings and structures in Auckland
Hospitals established in 1991
1991 establishments in New Zealand
1990s architecture in New Zealand